Fever Fever, is an American Christian music band. They come from Columbus, Ohio. The band started making music in 2005. Their membership is Drew Murfin, Wes Black, Andrew Bashaw, and Zack Taylor. The band released three extended plays while they were independent from a label; Fever Fever in 2008, Kingdom in 2012, and Native Color in 2013. They released an album, LoveQuest independently in 2009. Their first studio album, Aftermath was released by Slospeak Records, in 2014.

Background
Fever Fever is an alternative indie band from Columbus, Ohio. Their current members are lead vocalist and guitarist Drew Murfin, multi-instrumentalist Wes Black, bassist Andrew Bashaw, and drummer and background vocalist Zack Taylor.

Music history
The band commenced as a musical entity in 2005, with their first release Fever Fever, an extended play, that was independently released in 2008. Their second release, an album LoveQuest, was released independently the next year. They released two more extended plays, Kingdom in 2012, and Native Color in 2013. Their first studio album, Aftermath, was released on September 16, 2014, from Slospeak Records. They released two singles from this album to Christian rock radio stations, where Billboard magazine reports "Hypnotized" peaked at No. 7, and their current single "Aftermath" has charted at No. 30.

Members
Current members
 Drew Murfin – lead vocals, guitar
 Wes Black – multi-instrumentalist
 Andrew Bashaw – bass
 Zack Taylor – drums
Past members
 Sam Smith – drums, vocals
 Vince Gaietto - bass, vocals

Discography
Studio albums
 Aftermath (September 16, 2014, Slospeak)
Independent albums
 LoveQuest (2009)
Independent EPs
 Fever Fever (2008)
 Kingdom (2012)
 Native Color (2013)
Singles

References

External links
 Official website

Musical groups from Columbus, Ohio
2005 establishments in Ohio
Musical groups established in 2005